Robert Isaac may refer to:
 Bobby Isaac (1932-1977), NASCAR driver
 Robert M. Isaac, Republican mayor
 Robert Isaac (footballer, born 1965), former Chelsea footballer